Shovgenovsky District is an administrative and a municipal district (raion), one of the seven in the Republic of Adygea, Russia. It is located in the central northern portion of the republic and borders with Ust-Labinsky District of Krasnodar Krai in the north, Kurganinsky District of Krasnodar Krai in the north and northeast, Koshekhablsky District in the east and southeast, Giaginsky District in the south, Belorechensky District of Krasnodar Krai in the southwest, and with Krasnogvardeysky District in the west. Its administrative center is the rural locality (an aul) of Khakurinokhabl. As of the 2010 Census, the total population of the district was 16,997, with the population of Khakurinokhabl accounting for 23.8% of that number.

History
History of Shovgenovsky District dates back to July 27, 1922, when Adyghe (Cherkess) Autonomous Oblast was established within the Russian SFSR. At that time, the autonomous oblast consisted of three okrugs, one of which, Farssky, covered the territory of modern Shovgenovsky District. On August 5, 1924, Farssky Okrug was renamed Khakurinokhablsky District. On December 7, 1956, Khakurinokhablsky District was abolished, and its territory distributed among Koshekhablsky, Giaginsky, and Krasnogvardeysky Districts. On January 12, 1965, however, the district was re-established under the name of Shovgenovsky. During all of the district's history, the aul of Khakurinokhabl served as the district's administrative center.

Administrative and municipal status
Within the framework of administrative divisions, Shovgenovsky District is one of the seven in the Republic of Adygea and has administrative jurisdiction over all of its thirty-one rural localities. As a municipal division, the district is incorporated as Shovgenovsky Municipal District. Its thirty-one rural localities are incorporated into six rural settlements within the municipal district. The aul of Khakurinokhabl serves as the administrative center of both the administrative and municipal district.

Municipal composition
Dukmasovskoye Rural Settlement
Administrative center: khutor of Dukmasov
other localities of the rural settlement:
khutor of Chikalov
khutor of Kasatkin
khutor of Mamatsev
khutor of Mokronazarov
khutor of Orekhov
khutor of Pentyukhov
khutor of Pikalin
khutor of Tikhonov
Dzherokayskoye Rural Settlement
Administrative center: aul of Dzherokay
other localities of the rural settlement:
khutor of Semyono-Makarensky
khutor of Svobodny Trud
Khakurinokhablskoye Rural Settlement
Administrative center: aul of Khakurinokhabl
other localities of the rural settlement:
khutor of Khapachev
khutor of Kirov
Khatazhukayskoye Rural Settlement
Administrative center: aul of Pshicho
other localities of the rural settlement:
aul of Kabekhabl
aul of Khatazhukay
settlement of Leskhozny
aul of Pshizov
Mamkhegskoye Rural Settlement
Administrative center: aul of Mamkheg
Zarevskoye Rural Settlement
Administrative center: settlement of Zarevo
other localities of the rural settlement:
khutor of Chernyshev
khutor of Doroshenko
khutor of Kelemetov
khutor of Leyboabazov
khutor of Mikhaylov
khutor of Novorusov
settlement of Ulsky
khutor of Vesyoly
khutor of Zadunayevsky

References

Notes

Sources

Districts of Adygea